Justice Hutchinson may refer to:

Anderson Hutchinson, associate justice of the Republic of Texas Supreme Court
Foster Hutchinson, associate justice of the Massachusetts Supreme Judicial Court
Titus Hutchinson, associate justice and chief justice of the Vermont Supreme Court
William Easton Hutchinson, associate justice of the Kansas Supreme Court

See also
John B. Hutcheson, associate justice of the Supreme Court of Georgia